Robert Malachy Burke (1 March 1907 – 20 September 1998) was a noted Christian socialist and philanthropist. He was born into a landed Church of Ireland family at Ballydugan, Loughrea, County Galway.

He was active (alongside his wife, Ann Grattan of Belfast) in a variety of organisations in the fields of community development, co-operativism, peace activism, religion, and politics. At Toghermore, Tuam (the birthplace of his mother, Ethel Maud Henry), where he came to live following his parents’ separation, he established an innovative co-operative farm.

As a Labour Party representative, he sat on Galway County Council, but despite polling strongly in Galway East at a number of elections, he was not elected to the Dáil Éireann.

He entered Seanad Éireann in 1948 through Agricultural Panel, but resigned his seat on 6 December 1950.

Following the death of his mother, Burke gifted his property to the Irish health authorities for use in the struggle against tuberculosis, and, early in 1951, he took up a position as a development worker with an Anglican charity in Nigeria. Alongside his wife, he worked during the next decades with various agencies in Africa, before the couple retired to Belfast. He died in 1998.

Sources
John Cunningham, ‘Bobby Burke: Christian Socialist’, in J.A. Claffey (ed.) Glimpses of Tuam since the Famine, Tuam 1997, pp. 239–53.

References

1907 births
1998 deaths
Irish Anglicans
20th-century Irish farmers
Labour Party (Ireland) senators
Members of the 6th Seanad
People from County Galway
Irish Christian socialists
Anglican socialists